Miss Venezuela 2012 was the 59th edition of the Miss Venezuela pageant held on August 30, 2012 at the Hotel Tamanaco Intercontinental in Caracas, Venezuela. At the end of the event, outgoing titleholder Irene Esser crowned Gabriela Isler of Guárico as her successor.

The queens of this edition went on to have successful runs in many international beauty pageants such as Gabriela Isler and Alyz Henrich, winners of Miss Universe 2013 and Miss Earth 2013 respectively.

Results 
Color key

Δ

Special Awards

Public Votes 

During the final telecast, the audience had the chance to vote for the contestants to make one of them in top 10. The winner was Rocireé Silva (Península Goajira).

Official Contestants
24 candidates competed for the title.

Contestants Notes 

Gabriela Isler won Miss Universe 2013 in Moscow, Russia.
Elian Herrera unplaced in Miss International 2013 in Tokyo, Japan.
Alyz Henrich won Miss Earth 2013 in Alabang, Muntinlupa, Philippines.
Ivanna Vale (Táchira) won Reinado Internacional del Café 2013 in Manizales, Colombia.
Millunay Hull (Cojedes) won Miss World Next Top Model 2015 in Beirut, Lebanon.
María Teresa Solano (Barinas) placed as Virreina (2nd place) in Reinado Internacional del Trópico 2012 in San Pedro Sula, Honduras.
Daniela Chalbaud (Distrito Capital) won Miss Intercontinental 2012 in Aachen, Germany.
Nerys Díaz (Portuguesa) placed as 1st runner-Up in Reina Mundial del Banano 2012 in Machala, Ecuador.
Vicmary Rivero (Lara) placed as semifinalist (Top 12) in Miss América Latina 2014 in Punta Cana, Dominican Republic
Mariana Romero (Apure) placed as Virreina (2nd place) representing Los Roques in Miss Latinoamérica 2014 in Panama City, Panamá.

Gala Interactiva de la Belleza (Interactive Beauty Gala)

This preliminary event took place on August 11, 2012 at the Estudio 1 de Venevisión, co-hosted by Erika de la Vega and Mariela Celis. The following awards were given:

External links
Miss Venezuela Official Website

Miss Venezuela
2012 beauty pageants
2012 in Venezuela